Oberviechtach is a town in the district of Schwandorf, in Bavaria, Germany. It is famous for being the birthplace of Johann Andreas Eisenbarth. The name comes from pine (Fichte) which is also represented on the coat of arms of the town.

Oberviechtach was chartered and given market rights by Count Palatine Rudolf II and Ruprecht I on May 5, 1337.

References

Schwandorf (district)
1330s establishments in the Holy Roman Empire
1337 establishments in Europe